In the phonology of the Romanian language, the phoneme inventory consists of seven vowels, two or four semivowels (different views exist), and twenty consonants. In addition, as with other languages, other phonemes can occur occasionally in interjections or recent borrowings.

Vowels

There are seven monophthongs in Romanian:

The table below gives a series of word examples for each vowel.

Although most of these vowels are relatively straightforward and similar or identical to those in many other languages, the close central unrounded vowel  is uncommon as a phoneme and especially uncommon amongst Indo-European languages.

Less frequent vowels

ö
In addition to the seven core vowels, in a number of words of foreign origin (predominantly French, but also German) the mid front rounded vowel  (rounded Romanian ; example word: bleu  'light blue') and the mid central rounded vowel  (rounded Romanian ; example word: chemin de fer  'Chemin de Fer') have been preserved, without replacing them with any of the existing phonemes. The borrowed words have become part of the Romanian vocabulary and follow the usual inflexion rules, so that the new vowels, though less common, could be considered as part of the Romanian phoneme set. Many Romanian dictionaries use  in their phonetic descriptions to represent both vowels.

Because they are not native phonemes, their pronunciation may fluctuate or they may even be replaced by the diphthong .

ü
Similarly, borrowings from languages such as French and German sometimes contain the close front rounded vowel : ecru , tul , führer . Educated speakers usually pronounce it , but other realizations such as  also occur. For instance, Turkish kül became ghiul  ('large ring'), Turkish tütün became tutun  ('tobacco'), but tiutiun  in the Moldavian subdialect, German Düse gave duză  ('nozzle') and French bureau became birou  ('desk', 'office').

Diphthongs and triphthongs

In addition to these, the semivowels  and  can be combined (either before, after, or both) with most vowels. One view considers that only  and  can follow an obstruent-liquid cluster such as in broască ('frog') and dreagă ('to mend') and form real diphthongs, whereas the rest are merely vowel–glide sequences.
The traditional view (taught in schools) considers all of the above as diphthongs.

Impressionistically, the two pairs sound very similar to native speakers. In some regional pronunciations, the diphthong  tends to be pronounced as a single vowel .

Diphthongs in borrowings 
Generally, these borrowings have retained their original spellings, but their pronunciation has been adapted to Romanian phonology. The table below gives some examples.

Borrowings such as whisky and week-end are listed in some dictionaries as starting with the ascending diphthong , which corresponds to the original English pronunciation, but in others they appear with the descending diphthong .

Vowel alternations
Romanian has vowel alternation or apophony triggered by stress. A stressed syllable has a low vowel, or a diphthong ending in a low vowel, and an unstressed syllable has a mid vowel.

This alternation developed from Romanian vowel breaking (diphthongization) and reduction (weakening). The Eastern Romance mid vowels  were broken in stressed syllables, giving the Romanian diphthongs , and the low vowel  was reduced in unstressed syllables, giving the Romanian central vowel .

These sound changes created the stress-triggered vowel alternations in the table below. Here stressed syllables are marked with underlining (a):

This has since been morphologized and now shows up in verb conjugations and nominal inflection: oaste — oști, 'army' — 'armies'.

Consonants 
Standard Romanian has twenty phonemic consonants, as listed in the table below.

Besides the consonants in this table, a few consonants can have allophones:
 Palatalized consonants occur when preceding an underlying word-final , which is then deleted.

The consonant inventory of Romanian is similar to Italian. Romanian has the fricative  and the glottal fricative , which do not occur in Italian.

Palatalized consonants
Palatalized consonants appear mainly at the end of words, and mark two grammatical categories: plural nouns and adjectives, and second person singular verbs.

The interpretation commonly taken is that an underlying morpheme  palatalizes the consonant and is subsequently deleted.

In certain morphological processes  is replaced by the full vowel , for example
 in noun plural genitive formation: școli — școlilor  ('schools — of the schools'),
 when appending the definite article to some plural nouns: brazi — brazii  ('fir trees — the fir trees')
 in verb + pronoun combinations: dați — dați-ne  ('give — give us').

This may explain why  is perceived as a separate sound by native speakers and written with the same letter as the vowel .

The non-syllabic  can be sometimes found inside compound words like câțiva  ('a few') and oricare  ('whichever'), where the first morpheme happened to end in this . A word that contains this twice is cincizeci  ('fifty').

It is found at the end of some words after consonants and semivowels, as in un urs, pronounced  ('a bear'), or îmi spui  ('you tell me'). The disappearance of this phoneme might be attributed to the fact that, unlike , it didn't play any morphological role. It is a trace of Latin endings containing  (-us, -ūs, -um, -ō), this phoneme is related to vowel  used to connect the definite article "l" to the stem of a noun or adjective, as in domn — domnul  ('lord — the lord', cf. Latin dominus).

Other consonants 

As with other languages, Romanian interjections often use sounds beyond the normal phoneme inventory or disobey the normal phonotactical rules, by containing unusual phoneme sequences, by allowing words to be made up of only consonants, or by consisting of repetitions. Such exceptional mechanisms are needed to obtain an increased level of expressivity. Often, these interjections have multiple spellings or occasionally none at all, which accounts for the difficulty of finding the right approximation using existing letters. The following is a list of examples.

 A bilabial click , pronounced by rounding the lips and strongly sucking air between them, is used for urging horses to start walking.
 Whistling is another interjection surpassing the limits of the phoneme inventory. It is usually spelled fiu-fiu.
 The dental click  (see also click consonants) is used in an interjection similar to the English tut-tut (or tsk-tsk), expressing concern, disappointment, disapproval, etc., and generally accompanied by frowning or a comparable facial expression. Usually two to four such clicks in a row make up the interjection; only one click is rare and more than four can be used for over-emphasis. The Romanian spelling is usually tț, ttt or țțț.
 The same dental click is used in another interjection, the informal equivalent of "no" (nu in Romanian). Only one click is emitted, usually as an answer to a yes-no question. Although there is rarely any accompanying sound, the usual spelling is nt or nț.
 A series of interjections are pronounced with the mouth shut. Depending on intonation, length, and rhythm, they can have various meanings, such as: perplexity, doubt, displeasure, tastiness, toothache, approval, etc. Possible spellings include: hm, hâm/hîm, mhm, îhî, mmm, îî, hî. Phonetically similar, but semantically different, is the English interjection ahem.
 Another interjection, meaning "no", is pronounced  (with a high-low phonetic pitch). Possible spellings include: î-î, îm-îm, and m-m. The stress pattern is opposite to the interjection for "yes" mentioned before, pronounced  (with a low-high phonetic pitch).
 Pfu expresses contempt or dissatisfaction and starts with the voiceless bilabial fricative , sounding like (but being different from) the English whew, which expresses relief after an effort or danger.
 Câh/cîh expresses disgust and ends in the voiceless velar fricative , similar in meaning to English ugh.
 Brrr expresses shivering cold and is made up of a single consonant, the bilabial trill, whose IPA symbol is

Stress 
Romanian has a stress accent, like almost all other Romance languages (with the notable exception of French). Generally, stress falls on the last syllable of a stem (that is, the root and derivational material but excluding inflections and final inflectional vowels).  Although a lexically marked stress pattern with penultimate stress exists, any morphologically derived forms will continue to follow the unmarked pattern.

 fráte  ('brother'), copíl  ('child')

 strúgure  ('grape'), albástru  ('blue'), călătór  ('voyager').

Stress is not normally marked in writing, except occasionally to distinguish between homographs, or in dictionaries for the entry words. When it is marked, the main vowel of the stressed syllable receives an accent (usually acute, but sometimes grave), for example véselă — vesélă ('jovial', fem. sg. — 'tableware').

In verb conjugation, noun declension, and other word formation processes, stress shifts can occur. Verbs can have homographic forms only distinguished by stress, such as in el suflă which can mean 'he blows' (el súflă) or 'he blew' (el suflắ) depending on whether the stress is on the first or the second syllable, respectively. Changing the grammatical category of a word can lead to similar word pairs, such as the verb a albí  ('to whiten') compared to the adjective álbi  ('white', masc. pl.). Stress in Romanian verbs can normally be predicted by comparing tenses with similar verbs in Spanish, which does indicate stress in writing.

Secondary stress occurs according to a predictable pattern, falling on every other syllable, starting with the first, as long as it does not fall adjacent to the primary stress.

Prosody

Rhythm 
Languages such as English, Russian, and Arabic are called stress-timed, meaning that syllables are pronounced at a lower or higher rate so as to achieve a roughly equal time interval between stressed syllables. Another category of languages are syllable-timed, which means that each syllable takes about the same amount of time, regardless of the position of the stresses in the sentence. Romanian is one of the syllable-timed languages, along with other Romance languages (French, Spanish, etc.), Telugu, Yoruba, and many others. (A third timing system is mora timing, exemplified by Classical Latin, Fijian, Finnish, Hawaiian, Japanese, and Old English.)

The distinction between these timing categories may sometimes seem unclear, and definitions vary. In addition, the time intervals between stresses/syllables/morae are in reality only approximately equal, with many exceptions and large deviations having been reported. However, whereas the actual time may be only approximately equal, the differences are perceptually identical.

In the case of Romanian, consonant clusters are often found both in the syllable onset and coda, which require physical time to be pronounced. The syllable timing rule is then overridden by slowing down the rhythm. Thus, it is seen that stress and syllable timing interact. The sample sentences below, each consisting of six syllables, are illustrative:

 Mama pune masa – Mom sets the table

 Mulți puști blonzi plâng prin curți – Many blond kids cry in the courtyards

The total time length taken by each of these sentences is obviously different, and attempting to pronounce one of them with the same rhythm as the other results in unnatural utterances.

To a lesser extent, but still perceivably, the syllables are extended in time also on one hand by the presence of liquid and nasal consonants, and on the other by that of semivowels in diphthongs and triphthongs, such as shown in the examples below.

A simple way to evaluate the length of a word, and compare it to another, consists in pronouncing it repeatedly at a natural speech rate.

Intonation 
A detailed description of the intonation patterns must consider a wide range of elements, such as the focus of the sentence, the theme and the rheme, emotional aspects, etc. In this section only a few general traits of the Romanian intonation are discussed. Most importantly, intonation is essential in questions, especially because, unlike English and other languages, Romanian does not distinguish grammatically declarative and interrogative sentences.

In non-emphatic yes/no questions the pitch rises at the end of the sentence until the last stressed syllable. If unstressed syllables follow, they often have a falling intonation, but this is not a rule.

 — Ai stins lumina? [ai stins lu↗mi↘na] (Have you turned off the light?)

 — Da. (Yes.)

In Transylvanian speech these yes/no questions have a very different intonation pattern, usually with a pitch peak at the beginning of the question: [ai ↗stins lumi↘na]

In selection questions the tone rises at the first element of the selection, and falls at the second.

 — Vrei bere sau vin? [vrei ↗bere sau ↘vin] (Do you want beer or wine?)

 — Bere. (Beer.)

Wh-questions start with a high pitch on the first word and then the pitch falls gradually toward the end of the sentence.

 — Cine a lăsat ușa deschisă? [↗cine↘ a lăsat ușa deschisă] (Who left the door open?)

 — Mama. (Mom did.)

Repeat questions have a rising intonation.

 — A sunat Rodica adineauri. (Rodica just called.)

 — Cine a sunat? [cine a su↗nat] (Who called?)

 — Colega ta, Rodica. (Your classmate, Rodica.)

Tag questions are uttered with a rising intonation.

 — Ți-e foame, nu-i așa? [ți-e foame, nu-i a↗șa] (You're hungry, aren't you?)

Unfinished utterances have a rising intonation similar to that of yes/no questions, but the pitch rise is smaller.

 — După ce m-am întors... [după ce m-am în↗tors...] (After I came back...)

Various other intonation patterns are used to express: requests, commands, surprise, suggestion, advice, and so on.

Example text

References

Bibliography

External links

 Very detailed Romanian grammar, with some notes on phonetics and morpho-phonology (PDF; 183 pages; 4.6 MB)
  DEX online, a collection of Romanian language dictionaries; one-letter entries indicate the possible pronunciations
 Romanian Language Sounds Sounds of the Romanian Language Project (SROL)
 Rhymes Dictionary – dictionar de rime  Romanian Rhymes Dictionary – allows the user to obtain words which rhyme with the search word (possible indication of pronunciation rules)

Phonology
Italic phonologies